Weasel Stop is a 1956 Warner Bros. Looney Tunes animated short film directed by Robert McKimson. The cartoon was released on February 11, 1956, and features Foghorn Leghorn.

The cartoon is unusual in that a different dog (instead of the Barnyard Dawg) is used as Foghorn's nemesis. The title is a pun on the phrase "whistle stop".

Plot
A shaggy dog (played by Lloyd Perryman) is the guard at a farm's chicken coop when a lip-smacking weasel comes along, intending to gain access to the chickens. And, never one to side with a canine, Foghorn Leghorn opts to help the weasel by trying to violently remove the guard dog. The rooster and weasel try various methods of getting rid of the dog, but wind up losing all their feathers and fur in a hay baling machine. The cartoon ends with Foghorn saying "Fortunately, I always keep my feathers numbered for just such an emergency," a line used in several Warner Bros. Cartoons; after the iris out, the weasel reappears wearing its hay bale of fur and runs off in search of another meal.

Voice cast
Mel Blanc as Foghorn Leghorn, Willy the Weasel, Hen, Dog Barks
Lloyd Perryman as Shaggy Dog (uncredited)

References

1956 films
1956 short films
1956 comedy films
1956 animated films
1950s English-language films
1950s Warner Bros. animated short films
Looney Tunes shorts
Foghorn Leghorn films
Animated films about dogs
Films about weasels
Films set on farms
Films set in 1956
Films directed by Robert McKimson
Films produced by Edward Selzer
Films scored by Milt Franklyn
Warner Bros. Cartoons animated short films